

Provinces (2019)

This is a list of provinces by Human Development Index according to new formed Provinces of Nepal:

Former regions (2021)

This is a list of former development regions of Nepal (until 2015) by Human Development Index as of 2021.

Trends by UNDP reports (International HDI) 
Human Development Index (by UN Method) of regions in Nepal since 1990.

See also 

 List of Nepalese provinces by Population
 List of Nepalese provinces by GDP
 List of countries by HDI
 Administrative divisions of Nepal

References 

Human Development Index
Nepal
Nepal
Human Development Index